Duh or DUH may refer to:

 DUH (band), a California-based noise and alternative rock group
 Duh (album), a 1992 album by the punk rock band Lagwagon
 "Duh", a 2009 song by rapper Brianna Perry
 Matija Duh (1989–2013), Slovenian motorcycle speedway rider
 Deutsche Umwelthilfe e. V., a German environmental NGO
 Dyschromatosis universalis hereditaria, a hereditary skin disorder
 DUH, FAA code for Toledo Suburban Airport, Michigan
 duh, ISO 639-3 code for the Bhilori language

See also 

 D'oh!